Vladislav Aleksandrovich Deulin (born 5 May 1994) is a Russian sport climber. He is the current world leader in speed climbing.

Rankings

Climbing World Cup

Climbing World Championships 
Adult

Climbing European Championships 
Adult

Number of medals in the Climbing World Cup

Speed

See also
List of grade milestones in rock climbing
History of rock climbing
Rankings of most career IFSC gold medals

References

External links 

Living people
1994 births
Russian rock climbers
IFSC Climbing World Cup overall medalists
Speed climbers